Sardar R. P. Singh is an Indian Sikh politician and member of the Bharatiya Janata Party. Sardar R. P. Singh was a member of the Delhi Legislative Assembly from the Rajinder Nagar in New Delhi district. He is the National secretary of the Delhi Bharatiya Janata Party and a national spokesperson for the party.

References 

1961 births
Indian Sikhs
Living people
People from Delhi
Bharatiya Janata Party politicians from Delhi
Members of the Delhi Legislative Assembly
21st-century Indian politicians
Delhi politicians